Iruvar Mattum is a 2006 Indian Tamil language thriller film directed by Dwaraki Raghavan. The film stars Abhay and Sunitha Varma. The film, produced by R. Jagadish, was released on 30 November 2006.

Plot

The film begins with an old couple going back to the forest to retrace their roots.

In a flashback, the hermit Azhagu (Abhay) lived in a wooden house in the forest. He ate only fruits and loved to take care of the wild animals. The carefree college student Selvi (Sunitha Varma) ran away from her house after her parents prepared her marriage with a man she did not like and she lost her way in the forest. Once night has fallen, she entered Azhagu's house to sleep and met the eccentric Azhagu. The next day, Selvi realized that he was different and loved his mother than anything. Selvi then begged him to get her out of the forest, but during the walk, the way was blocked by fallen trees and she turned back. Selvi stayed in Azhagu's house, and the two squabbled like children over small things, but they eventually fell in love with each other and Selvi could not leave the place. They decided to get married, so Azhagu introduced her to his mother, who turns out to be skeletal remains of her. A shocked Selvi tries to run away from Azhagu, but he abducted her and tied the knot with her. Selvi then tried to escape for a second time; during the run, she was wounded and Azhagu took care of her. Selvi tried to reason with Azhagu, but he became aggressive and strongly believed that his mother was still alive. Selvi made him believe that his mother will be reborn in her belly; thus, she became pregnant and gave birth to a baby.

Back to the present, the old couple is none other than Azhagu and Selvi. Selvi makes fun of Azhagu, who has now recovered from his mental illness, and they both laugh.

Cast
Abhay as Azhagu (Azhagu Sundaram)
Sunitha Varma as Selvi

Production

Kannada director Dwaraki Raghavan made his directorial debut in Tamil with By 2, an experimental film which featured just two characters. Kannada actor Srinagar Kitty, credited as Abhay, was selected to play the hero while Sunitha Varma played his love interest. The film was shot in the deep jungles of Tamil Nadu, Kerala and Karnataka. Vijay Antony composed the music, Murali took care of art direction and the cinematography was by P. K. H. Das. Dwaraki Raghavan said, "The movie has an innovative storyline; the happenings revolve around the forest. It has the trappings to sustain the audience interest and pave way for a new trend in the industry. Should that happen, it will be a great feeling and give the confidence to try a few other experiments". Following State government's announcement of tax exemption for films titled in Tamil language, the title was changed from By 2 to Iruvar Mattum.

Soundtrack

The soundtrack was composed by Vijay Antony. The soundtrack features 6 tracks with lyrics written by Vairamuthu.

Reception
A reviewer stated, "director Dwaraki Raghavan has proved that a film can be made with just two characters, provided it has a smart story and script, backed by good technical support. Iruvar Mattum surely scores on the novelty aspect". Sify said, "the film drags as two characters get on to your nerves. Still, if you like to try out something different, then Iruvar Matttum is worth a glance". A reviewer wrote, "PKH Das cinematography and Udayakumar’s special sound effects are the real highlights of the movie and two new comers also made a brilliant come back in every sequence" and called it "average". S. R. Ashok Kumar of The Hindu wrote, "The thought is good and novel but the presentation could have been more sophisticated and refined" and praised the technical crew.

References

2006 films
2000s Tamil-language films
Indian thriller films
Indian avant-garde and experimental films
Films scored by Vijay Antony
2000s avant-garde and experimental films
Two-handers
2006 thriller films